Mehrabad (also Romanized as Mehrābād; also known as Mehrābād-e Bālā and Mehr Abad Meibod) is a village in Shohada Rural District, in the Central District of Meybod County, Yazd Province, Iran. At the 2006 census, its population was 821, in 207 families.

References 

Populated places in Meybod County